Kankalaba  is a department or commune of Léraba Province in south-western  Burkina Faso, a landlocked country in west Africa. Its capital lies at the town of Kankalaba. According to the 1996 census the department has a total population of 9,199.

Towns and villages

 Kankalaba	(1 633 inhabitants) (capital)
 Bougoula	(1 652 inhabitants)
 Dagban	(1 854 inhabitants)
 Dionso	(716 inhabitants)
 Fassaladougou	(256 inhabitants)
 Kaniagara	(849 inhabitants)
 Kolasso	(1 210 inhabitants)
 Niantono	(1 029 inhabitants)

References

Departments of Burkina Faso
Léraba Province